Phaedon tumidulus, also known as the celery leaf beetle, is a species of leaf beetle in the genus Phaedon. 
It is associated with umbellifers.

Description
Phaedon tumidulus adult beetles measure 3.5–4.01 mm in length. They are usually dark green or brassy in colour, but are occasionally blueish.

References

Beetles described in 1824
Chrysomelinae
Beetles of Europe
Taxa named by Ernst Friedrich Germar